The most popular Latin pop songs in 2001, ranked by radio airplay audience impressions and measured by Nielsen BDS.

References

United States Latin Pop Airplay
2001
2001 in Latin music